Stadttheater Fürth is a theatre in Bavaria, Germany. It was designed by the Viennese architecture office Fellner & Helmer, and completed in 1902.

References

Theatres in Bavaria
Fellner & Helmer buildings
Art Nouveau architecture in Germany
Art Nouveau theatres
Theatres completed in 1902